Pain Neve is a neve between Commonwealth Range and Hughes Range from which the Keltie Glacier drains southwestward to enter Beardmore Glacier. Named by the Southern Party of New Zealand Geological Survey Antarctic Expedition (NZGSAE) (1961–62) for Kevin Pain, field assistant with the party.

Snow fields of the Ross Dependency
Dufek Coast